Lisa Jackman is a British retired gymnast.

Gymnastics career
Jackman represented England and she won a silver medal in the team event, at the 1978 Commonwealth Games in Edmonton, Alberta, Canada.

References

Living people
British female artistic gymnasts
Gymnasts at the 1978 Commonwealth Games
Year of birth missing (living people)
Commonwealth Games medallists in gymnastics
Commonwealth Games silver medallists for England
Medallists at the 1978 Commonwealth Games